Grambach was a municipality, now merged into Raaba-Grambach in 2015, in the district of Graz-Umgebung in the Austrian state of Styria. The other town, Raaba, was also dissolved into the merger.

Population

References

Cities and towns in Graz-Umgebung District